The 1982 Montreal Molson Light Challenge was a tennis tournament. Jimmy Connors won in the final 6–4, 6–3 against Björn Borg.

Players

Draw

Finals

References

Sports competitions in Montreal
Montreal Molson Light Challenge
Montreal Molson Light Challenge
Toronto Indoor